A list of suspects and convictions related to the 2004 Madrid Train Bombings.

Convicted defendants 

Jamal Zougam – guilty and given a 50,000-year jail sentence, was arrested two days after the March 2004 attacks.

José Emilio Suárez Trashorras- guilty and given between a 25,000 to 35,000-year jail sentence. and was one of the first to be arrested.

Hamid Ahmidan – found guilty and given between a 23- to 25-year sentence. Moroccan and a cousin of Jamal Ahmidan, these men took part in drug trafficking. His release date from prison is November 2030. After his release, he will be deported to Morocco.

Abdelmajid Bouchar – acquitted of all the bombings and still given between a 15- to 18-year sentence, was detained in Belgrade in August 2005 by Serbian officials. His release date is set for November 2023. He will be deported to Morocco.

Rachid Aglif – found guilty and given between a 15- to 18-year sentence. he was arrested in April and he was an alleged lieutenant of Jamal Ahmidan, who was suspected of having helped acquire the explosives. His release date is set for November 2025. He will be deported to Morocco. While a prisoner in El Castellón, he established a "special friendship" with imam Abdelbaki Es Satty, main suspect of the 2017 Barcelona attacks.

Youssef Belhadj – 30, acquitted of bombings but given 12.5-year sentence for membership of a terrorist organisation. He was arrested in Belgium in February 2005 by the Belgian Police, he allegedly set the date for the attacks and was in Spain for the last-minute preparations. Released November 2019 and deported to Morocco.

Hassan el-Haski – 45 acquitted of bombings but handed 12-year sentence for membership of a terrorist organisation. He was the leader of the Moroccan Islamic Combatant Group in Spain, which prosecutors blamed for the bombings. Haski, from Morocco, but having been "a long time resident of Molenbeek" (Brussels), was arrested in the Canary Islands in December 2004. He was accused of having been aware of and having instigated the attacks. Released in November 2019 and deported to Morocco.

Mohamed Bouharrat, guilty and given 12-year sentence, was responsible for recruitment and gathering information on targets. Released in November 2019 and deported to Morocco.

Fouad el-Morabit – guilty, 12-year sentence was being held in March 2004 for allegedly belonging to the Madrid terror cell, he also had contacts with Rabei Osman. Released in November 2019 and deported to Morocco.

Mouhannad Almallah Dabas – guilty, 12-year sentence. Released and deported to Morocco.

Saed el-Harrak – guilty, 12-year sentence, currently described as an active cell member. Released in November 2019 and deported to Morocco.

Mohamed Larbi Ben Sellam, guilty, 12-year sentence, was allegedly in charge of bringing propaganda material to meetings of the cell. Prosecutors had asked for 27 years. Released in November 2019 and deported to Morocco.

Basel Ghalyoun – 26, guilty, 12-year sentence, was allegedly had links to Rabei Osman and the presumed ideological mastermind, Serhan Ben Abdelmajid Fakhet, a Tunisian who also died in the apartment blast. Prosecutors had sought a 12-year sentence. Released in November 2019 and deported to Morocco.

Rafa Zouhier – 27, guilty of obtaining explosives and given 10-year sentence. Released in November 2017 and deported.

Abdelilah el-Fadual el-Akil, guilty, nine-year sentence, was alleged close associate of Jamal Ahmidan, he had worked at a house on the outskirts of Madrid where some bombs had been made there. Prosecutors had asked for 12 years. Released and deported in November 2016.

Rául González Peláez – guilty and given a 5-year sentence, was allegedly helped him gain access to the explosives in exchange for cocaine. Prosecutors had sought an eight-year sentence. Released in November 2012.

Sergio Alvarez Sánchez – guilty, 3-year sentence travelled in January 2004 to Madrid with a sports bag containing up to 15 kg (33 lbs) of explosives for Jamal Ahmidan. Prosecutors had sought a four-year sentence. Released in November 2010.

Antonio Iván Reis Palacio – guilty, given 3-year sentence, transported explosives to Madrid, Spain. Spanish prosecutors had sought a four-year jail term. Released in November 2010.

Nasreddine Bousbaa – guilty, 3-year sentence, he was allegedly helped forge fake documents. Spanish prosecutors had asked for 13 years in jail. Released in November 2010 and deported.

Mahmoud Slimane Aoun – guilty, 3-year sentence. he was allegedly trying to help Jamal Ahmidan forge documents. Spanish prosecutors had asked for 13 years in jail. Released in November 2010 and deported.

Acquitted defendants
Rabei Osman – arrested in Milan, Italy in June 2004 by Italian State Police for supporting terrorism in Europe. He was held in an Italian prison before being transferred to Spain in 2007 and he was an alleged member of al-Jihad by Ayman al-Zawahiri. Osman was sentenced in Italy on 11 June 2006 to 10 years in prison for plotting terror attack in Italy and afterwards was extradited to Spain in 2007. In February 2007 Osman's trial began in Madrid, along with other 28 defendants, for having a key role in the 2004 Madrid train bombings.  In October 2007 Osman was acquitted in Madrid from all charges with other 5 suspects.

Wrongful arrest 
Brandon Mayfield was arrested 6 May 2004 on a material witness charge, on the basis of a fingerprint found after 11 March 2004 Madrid attacks. Although Spanish authorities were doubtful that the identification was correct, he was held for two weeks in federal custody until they conclusively identified the fingerprint as belonging to another man and was released by the FBI authorities.

Other suspects 
Mustafa Setmariam Nasar – arrested in Quetta, Pakistan in October 2005 as he was shopping for breakfast, close to the Pakistani-Afghan border by the Pakistani Inter-Services Intelligence. He was held as a Spanish citizenship since the late 1980s following marriage to a Spanish woman. He was wanted for the 2004 Madrid bombings and the 2005 London Bombings. The FBI had offered a US$5 million reward for his capture and President Pervez Musharraf of Pakistan stated in that his country has received a huge amount of substantial sums in bounties from American authorities.

Abdelilah Hriz – arrested in his native Morocco in January 2008 by Moroccan police. In Rabat, Hriz was found guilty and sentenced up to 20 years in prison in December 2008.

On 29 April 2011, the German Federal Police arrested 3 Moroccans in the western German city of Düsseldorf and one in nearby Bochum. The Moroccans were linked with the 2004 Madrid train bombings and 2005 London transit attacks. The arrests were based on suspicion they were planning a terror attack in the country, they said. Local media reports that officers had seized large amounts of explosives when the three were arrested. The three alleged terrorists were brought to a judge the next day and they are to remain in detention pending an awaiting trial.

References

External links
 Madrid bombing suspects. BBC.
 The Madrid Bombing. CBC.
 Spain furious as US blocks access to Madrid bombing chief
 Madrid Bombings: The Defendants
 Rabei court photos in Milan – By Almiaso Cavicchioni (2006)

2004 Madrid train bombings
War on terror